Afroeurydemus nigricornis is a species of leaf beetle  reported from the Republic of the Congo, the Democratic Republic of the Congo and Ivory Coast. It was first described from Garamba National Park by Brian J. Selman in 1972. Its host plants include the flowers of Lamiaceae and Rubiaceae.

References 

Eumolpinae
Beetles of Africa
Insects of the Republic of the Congo
Beetles of the Democratic Republic of the Congo
Insects of West Africa
Beetles described in 1972